The Showgirl Princess is a children's book written by Kylie Minogue. It was released on 21 September 2006 through Puffin Books. The book is aimed at girls aged six and upwards and is based on Minogue's life.

The hardcover book was illustrated by Swan Park. It features photos of Minogue taken by William Baker.

Jane Richardson, the book's editor, says that The Showgirl Princess will "appeal to little princesses everywhere who love to dress up and have fun. It brims with positive messages such as believing in yourself and the importance of friendship and teamwork."

Minogue stated that she wanted this book to have a positive attitude towards young people.

References
 Amazon.co.uk. link. Last accessed on April 17, 2006.
 DWSreview.com. link. Last accessed on April 17, 2006.
 MTV.tv. link. Last accessed April 17, 2006.
 Kylie-Unlimited.com. link Last accessed February 17, 2013

2006 children's books
Children's non-fiction books
Kylie Minogue
British picture books
British children's books
English non-fiction books
Puffin Books books